Huuhtanen is a surname of Finnish origin. Notable people with this surname include:

 Eetu Huuhtanen (born 2003), Finnish footballer
 Jorma Huuhtanen (born 1945), Finnish physician and politician
 Otto Huuhtanen (born 2000), Finnish footballer
 Väinö Huuhtanen (1896–1951), Finnish farmer and politician

See also 
 Huhtanen

Surnames of Finnish origin